Ramon Menezes Roma (born 3 May 1995), known as Ramon, is a Brazilian footballer who plays as a centre-back for Atlético Goianiense.

Life and career
Ramon started his professional career on February 6, 2013, when he played for Bahia de Feira in a Campeonato Baiano match against Jacuipense. At that time, Ramon was only 17 years old. He, then, went to play two seasons for Bahia de Feira.

In 2014, Ramon moved to Vitória, due to a partnership between the two clubs. At first, the defender played at Vitória's U20 team, but at the beginning of 2015, he was promoted to the senior team. On March 8, 2015, Ramon debuted for Vitória in a 0-0 tie against Juazeirense. He, then, slowly became one of the team's starters. On April 22, Vitória signed Ramon for four seasons. He went to become pivotal in Vitória's Série B campaign that year, which resulted in the club's promotion to Série A.

In 2017, Ramon was briefly loaned to Israeli club  Maccabi Tel Aviv where he played only 3 matches.

On March 10, 2020, Ramon signed with Cruzeiro. He debuted for the team on March 15 in a match against Coimbra Esporte Clube.

Honours
 Atlético Goianiense
Campeonato Goiano: 2022

References

External links
 

1995 births
Living people
Brazilian footballers
Brazilian expatriate footballers
Association football defenders
Campeonato Brasileiro Série A players
Campeonato Brasileiro Série B players
Esporte Clube Vitória players
Cruzeiro Esporte Clube players
Atlético Clube Goianiense players
Maccabi Tel Aviv F.C. players
Brazilian expatriate sportspeople in Israel
Expatriate footballers in Israel